The Pavamana Mantra (pavamāna meaning "being purified, strained", historically a name of Soma), also known as pavamāna abhyāroha (abhyāroha, lit. "ascending", being an Upanishadic technical term for "prayer")
is an ancient Indian mantra introduced in the Bṛhadāraṇyaka Upaniṣad (1.3.28.) The mantra was originally meant to be recited during the introductory praise of the soma sacrifice by the patron sponsoring the sacrifice.

Text and translation
The text of the mantra reads:

,
,
.

Swami Madhavananda offers the following translation:

From evil lead me to good,
From darkness lead me to light,
From death lead me to immortality.

Patrick Olivelle offers a slightly different translation:

From the unreal lead me to the real!
From the darkness lead me to the light!
From death lead me to immortality!

The more common modern translation differs slightly in the translation of the first line:

From falsehood lead me to truth,
From darkness lead me to light,
From death lead me to immortality.

These three statements are referred to as the three Pavamana Mantras. This is a stylistic addition that concludes a recitation; as such it is often included with the verse. The Upanishad itself does not end the line that way.

Sanskrit word meaning
  — "me"; first person pronoun, singular number, accusative case
  — "to truth"; accusative case of  "truth"; here accusative case shows the destination; becomes  due to sandhi; can be a synonym for "good" 
  — "lead"; causative, imperative mood, active voice, singular number, second person of root  "to go".
  — "from darkness"; ablative case of  "darkness"; becomes  due to sandhi
  — "to light"; accusative case of  "light"; becomes  due to sandhi
  — "from death"; ablative case of  "death"; becomes  due to sandhi

The Sanskrit term sat, which means "truth" or "what is existing, real", has a range of important religious meanings including "truth" or "the Absolute, Brahman". The passage immediately following the mantra explicitly identifies the unreal and darkness with death and the real and light with immortality, saying that all three portions of the mantra have the same meaning of "Make me immortal."
In the interpretation of Swami Krishnananda (1977), "From the nonexistent, from the unreal, from the apparent, lead me to the other side of it, the Existent, the Real, the Noumenon." According to this interpretation and in keeping with the philosophy of Vedanta, the text rejects the material world as "unreal", "dark" and "dead" and invokes a concept of the transcendental reality.

Usage in culture

The quote has been used as an opening statement for the Economic Survey 2021 by Krishnamurthy Subramanian, who reports to the finance minister under the Narendra Modi Government.

In 1976, the mantra was used for the lyrics for "Gita", a song by John McLaughlin's Mahavishnu Orchestra, from their album Inner Worlds.

In 2003, the mantra was worked into the theme Navras by Juno Reactor and used for the end credits of The Matrix Revolutions.

The mantra features in 'To Kiss or Not to Kiss' in the soundtrack of Battlestar Galactica (2004 TV series).

References

Ram K. Piparaiya, Ten Upanishads of Four Vedas, New Age Books (2003), p. 101.

Hindu mantras
Sanskrit words and phrases
Upanishadic concepts